Bianca Pitzorno (born 12 August 1942) is an Italian writer best known for her books for children and young adults. She is considered one of Italy's most important authors in that field.

She was born in Sassari. She studied archaeology and classical literature and then began a career producing programs for television. She began writing books for girls when she was 28. She also writes plays, screenplays and lyrics for songs. Pitzorno lives and works in Milan.

During the 1970s, she was head of children's programming for RAI television. Later, she worked on the children's television series  ("The blue tree").

Her books have been translated into many languages including French, German, Spanish, Greek, Polish, Hungarian, Korean and Japanese. Her children's stories blend contemporary reality with elements of magic.

She has translated into Italian works by authors such as J. R. R. Tolkien, Sylvia Plath, David Grossman, Tove Jansson and Soledad Cruz Guerra.

Pitzorno is a UNICEF Goodwill ambassador. She helped establish a library project in Cuba which makes literature in Italian and literature translated from Italian available to Cuban children. She also helps provide Cuban literature translated into Italian to youth in Italy.

Awards
  dell’Infanzia
 Premio Castello di Sanguinetto
 Cento Prize
 finalist for the Hans Christian Andersen Award

Selected works 
 Clorofilla dal cielo blu ("Chlorophyll from a blue sky") (1974), also adapted for film
  ("The incredible story of Lavinia") (1985)
 La bambola dell'alchimista ("The alchemist's doll") (1988)
  ("Listen to my heart") (1991)
  ("My little witch") (1997)
  ("The secret voice") (1998)
 Una scuola per Lavinia ("A school for Lavinia") (2005)

References 

1942 births
Living people
Italian women writers
Italian children's writers
Italian women children's writers
Italian translators